Lauren Oyler is an American author and critic. Her debut novel, Fake Accounts, was published in February 2021.

Early life and education 
Oyler was born and raised in Hurricane, West Virginia, where she attended Hurricane High School. She graduated in 2012 from Yale University with a degree in English on a National Merit Scholarship.

Career 
After graduating, Oyler moved to Berlin where she worked as a freelance copy editor. In 2015, she moved to New York to become an editor at Broadly, the now-defunct site on gender and identity for Vice. She also co-authored and ghostwrote two books with Alyssa Mastromonaco about Mastromonaco's time in the Obama administration. Her work has appeared in Harper's Magazine, The London Review of Books, The New York Times Magazine, The Guardian, The New Yorker, The Baffler, and The New York Review of Books, among others. Her negative review of Jia Tolentino’s essay collection Trick Mirror generated so much traffic that it crashed The London Review of Books’ website.

Her debut novel, Fake Accounts, was published by Catapult in February 2021.

Publications 
 Fake Accounts, Catapult, 2021 
 Who Thought This Was a Good Idea?: And Other Questions You Should Have Answers to When You Work in the White House, second author with Alyssa Mastromonaco, Little, Brown Book Group, 2017.
 So Here's the Thing...: Notes on Growing Up, Getting Older, and Trusting Your Gut, second author with Alyssa Mastromonaco, Twelve, 2019.

References

Year of birth missing (living people)
Living people
American women critics
21st-century American novelists
American women novelists
Place of birth missing (living people)
Yale University alumni
People from Hurricane, West Virginia
Novelists from West Virginia
21st-century American women writers